Mikhail Youzhny  and Mischa Zverev were the defending champions, but they chose not to participate this year.Julian Knowle and Jürgen Melzer won in the final 6–2, 5–7, [10–8] against Ross Hutchins and Jordan Kerr.

Seeds

Draw

External links
 Main Draw

Rakuten Japan Open Tennis Championships - Men's Doubles